Joel John Randall (born 29 October 1999) is an English professional footballer who plays as a midfielder for EFL League One club Peterborough United.

Career
Despite being a boyhood Southampton fan, Joel joined the Exeter City Academy at U11's after being spotted at one of the club's development centres. He started a scholarship with the club in the summer of 2016.

After progressing through the academy, Randall made his first-team debut in November 2017 during Exeter City's EFL Trophy tie against Chelsea U21s, replacing Jack Sparkes in the 62nd minute. Randall moved on loan to Taunton Town in January 2018, making his first appearance for the Peacocks in a 1–0 win over Swindon Supermarine. That same month, Randall was offered a professional contract by Exeter for the following season.

In July 2018, Randall joined Southern League Premier Division South side Tiverton Town on an initial six-month loan deal. However, he was recalled in November 2018. After being recalled by Exeter, Randall appeared for the club in their Checkatrade Trophy game with Bristol Rovers, netting his first goal for Exeter after stepping off the bench. Randall was an unused substitute two other times during the season's competition. In December 2018, he was loaned out to Bideford A.F.C. for the rest of the season.

On 1 August 2019, he was loaned out to Weston-super-Mare for six months. However, on 11 November 2019, Randall was recalled due to an injury crisis, to make up the numbers on the bench.

On 6 December 2019, Randall was loaned out to Weymouth for one month.

Randall made his first-team breakthrough at Exeter City in the 2020–21 season, scoring his first league goal away at Salford City in a 2–2 draw in September 2020 on the opening day of the season. He scored his first goal at home in a 2–0 win against Cambridge 3 weeks later. By the end of November, he had already scored 6 goals in League Two.

Career statistics

References

External links
Joel Randall player profile at Exeter City

1999 births
Living people
English footballers
Association football midfielders
Peterborough United F.C. players
Exeter City F.C. players
Taunton Town F.C. players
Tiverton Town F.C. players
Bideford A.F.C. players
Weston-super-Mare A.F.C. players
Weymouth F.C. players
Sportspeople from Salisbury
Sportspeople from Barnstaple
English Football League players